Seevetal (Northern Low Saxon: Seevdaal) is a municipality in the district of Harburg, in Lower Saxony, Germany. It is situated approximately 20 km south of Hamburg, and 15 km west of Winsen (Luhe). Its seat is in the village Hittfeld. It is named after the river Seeve.

History

On 1 July 1972, the administrations of 19 independent smaller municipalities were merged to form the Seevetal municipality.
The 19 towns and villages forming Seevetal are Beckedorf, Bullenhausen, Emmelndorf, Fleestedt, Glüsingen, Groß Moor, Helmstorf, Hittfeld, Holtorfsloh, Horst, Hörsten, Klein Moor, Lindhorst, Maschen, Meckelfeld, Metzendorf, Ohlendorf, Over and Ramelsloh.

Several of these towns have a rich history: the existence of Ramelsloh was first vouched in the year 845, Maschen was first mentioned in official documents in 1294, and Hittfeld celebrated its 900th anniversary in June 2007. The St. Mauritius church in Hittfeld dates back to the 12th century. Remarkable archaeological finds of the region are the Metzendorf-Woxdorf head burial dating to ca. 2200 BCE or the early Christian Maschen disc brooch which are in the permanent exhibition of the nearby Archaeological Museum Hamburg.

Demographics
Population of Seevetal (as of December 31 of each year):
1998 – 39,564
1999 – 40,164
2000 – 40,536
2001 – 40,819
2002 – 41,060
2003 – 41,157
2004 – 41,287
2005 – 41,614

Seevetal is the most populous German municipality that has no city rights, i.e., it is the most populous rural municipality ("Gemeinde") in Germany.

Politics
The council of the Seevetal municipality consists of 40 seats. The current council was elected on September 10, 2006 and consists of:
CDU – 17 seats
SPD – 13 seats
BIS – 4 seats
FDP – 3 seats
Alliance 90/The Greens – 3 seats

The current mayor Emily Weede (CDU) was elected on 26 September 2021.

Sport
 TuS Fleestedt
 HSG Seevetal
 TSV Eintracht Hittfeld
 SC Seevetal
 HSG Seevetal/Ashausen
 VfL Maschen
 ESV Maschen
 MTV Ramelsloh
 PBC Seevetal e.V. – Poolbillard
 SV Emmelndorf
 TV Meckelfeld
 Schützenverein Moor
 TSV Over Bullenhausen
 Windsurfer Seevetal e.V.

Twin towns – sister cities

Seevetal is twinned with:
 Decatur, United States

Notable people
Caroline Daur (born 1995), fashion blogger, grew up here

References

External links

 

Harburg (district)